Nevertheless is the fourth studio album by Christine Fellows, released on November 6, 2007 on Six Shooter Records. The album was principally inspired by the life and work of poet Marianne Moore; secondary inspirations include artist Joseph Cornell.

Fellows previously composed some songs on the album, including "The Spinster's Almanac", for a dance work by choreographer Susie Burpee.

The album was recorded at the Prairie Recording Co. studio in Winnipeg and the Manitou Opera House in Manitou, Manitoba. Guest musicians include Leanne Zacharias, Cristina Zacharias, Ed Riefel, Barry Mirochnick, Keith McLeod, Cam Loeppky, Greg Smith and John K. Samson.

Track listing 
 Let Us Have Done with the Umbrella of Our Contagion
 Not Wanted on the Voyage
 Saturday Night on Utopia Parkway
 The Spinster's Almanac
 To a Prize Bird
 Cruel Jim
 What Makes the Cherry Red
 The Parlour Rollers
 Outcast
 Poor Robin
 The Goddess of Macramé
 Nevertheless
 A Pantry Ballet
 Yours, and with Ever Grateful Wonder
 What Are Years?

References 

2007 albums
Christine Fellows albums
Six Shooter Records albums